Raquel Pankowsky (July 10, 1952 – March 28, 2022) was a Mexican Jewish film and television actress.

Early life 
Born in Mexico City, Mexico, she grew up in Narvarte, Mexico City. Pankowsky never married and did not have children. She was the daughter of Isabel and José Pankowsky, who divorced when Pankowsky was 6 years old. Her father died when she was 19, and her mother when she was 25.

A lifelong smoker, she began smoking when she was 11 years, she was diagnosed with COPD and faced with the likelihood that she would develop pulmonary emphysema if she did not give up smoking. She could not imagine herself not smoking, and was having a difficult time giving it up and turned to an addiction psychiatrist. After she successfully quit smoking, during an interview she said the best thing she's done in her life was to give up smoking.

Career 
Pankowsky began acting in high school. Pankowsky was an extra in the theater production of Hat Full of Rain (Un sombrero lleno de lluvia) and met Luis Gimeno who was also in the play. At that time Gimeno was the director of the school of the  National Association of Actors (ANDA), he encouraged her to study acting there.

In 2005 Pankowsky's role as Marta Sahagún, Mexico's First Lady and wife of President Vicente Fox, in El privilegio de mandar opened many doors for her and "gave her the greatest success of her career".

In 2016 she participated in the Bellas Artes reading promotional program “Leo… luego existo” (I read, therefore I exist) at the International Book Fair in Arteaga, where she read from the book "La culpa es de los Tlaxcaltecas " by Elena Garro, which encourages people of all ages to read.

Filmography

Telenovelas

Television

Film

Stage 
 Humo, amo y cosas peores (2010)
 Driving Miss Daisy (2013)
 Los Locos Adams (2015)
 El secuestro de la Cuquis (2015)

Awards 
 Premios TVyNovelas - Nominated for Best Leading Actress for Papá a Toda Madre in 2018
 Presea Luminaria de Oro - Career achievement award (Reconocimiento por Desempeño) in 2014
 TV Adicto Golden Awards - Awarded Best Leading Actress for Cachito de cielo in 2012
 Premios Calendario de Oro - Best Comedy Actress in 2007

References

External links 
 

1950 births
2022 deaths
Mexican television actresses
Mexican film actresses
Actresses from Mexico City
Mexican Jews
20th-century Mexican actresses
21st-century Mexican actresses